HD 148427, formally named Timir, is a 7th-magnitude K-type subgiant star approximately 193 light years away in the constellation Ophiuchus. Its mass is 45% greater than the Sun, and it is three times the size and six times more luminous, although its age is 2½ billion years. In 2020, this object's inclination was measured, revealing its true mass to be . This makes it a low-mass red dwarf star.

HD 148427, and HD 148427 b (thought at the time to be an exoplanet), were chosen as part of the 2019 NameExoWorlds campaign organised by the International Astronomical Union, which assigned each country a star and planet to be named. HD 148427 was assigned to Bangladesh. The winning name for the star was Timir meaning darkness in the Bengali language, alluding to the star being far away in the darkness of space. The winning name for the companion was Tondra meaning nap in the Bengali language, alluding to the symbolic notion that the object was asleep until discovered.

See also 
 List of extrasolar planets

References 

K-type subgiants
148427
080687
Ophiuchus (constellation)
Durchmusterung objects
Timir
Binary stars
M-type main-sequence stars